Royal Wedding is a 1951 American musical comedy film directed by Stanley Donen, and starring Fred Astaire and Jane Powell, with music by Burton Lane and lyrics by Alan Jay Lerner. Set in 1947 London at the time of the wedding of Princess Elizabeth and Philip Mountbatten, the film follows an American brother-sister song and dance duo who, while performing, each fall in love–he, with a female dancer, and she, with an impoverished but well-connected nobleman. The film marked Donen's second directorial feature. It was released as Wedding Bells in the United Kingdom.
 
Royal Wedding is one of several MGM musicals that entered the public domain because the studio failed to renew the copyright registration in the 28th year after its publication.

Plot
The story sees brother and sister Tom and Ellen Bowen as stars of a show Every Night at Seven, a Broadway success. They are persuaded to take the show to London, capitalizing on the imminent royal wedding of Princess Elizabeth and Philip Mountbatten.

On the ship, Ellen meets and quickly falls in love with the impoverished but well-connected Lord John Brindale. Whilst casting the show in London, Tom falls in love with a newly engaged dancer, Anne Ashmond. Tom assists Anne in reconciling her estranged parents and also asks his agent to locate Anne's supposed fiancé in Chicago – only to discover that he's married and therefore Anne is free to do what she likes.

Carried away by the emotion of the wedding, the two couples decide that they will also be married that day. Thanks to the resourcefulness of Tom's London agent, Edgar Klinger, who knows someone in the Archbishop's office who can cut through the official red tape and also has a cooperative minister in his pocket, Anne and Tom, and Ellen and John, are in fact married on the royal wedding day.

Cast
 Fred Astaire as Tom Bowen
 Jane Powell as Ellen Bowen
 Peter Lawford as Lord John Brindale
 Sarah Churchill as Anne Ashmond
 Keenan Wynn as Irving Klinger / Edgar Klinger
 Albert Sharpe as James Ashmond

Production
Stanley Donen and Jane Powell were not part of the film's original crew and cast; former dancer Charles Walters was the film's original director, with June Allyson as Astaire's co-star. Judy Garland was then signed as Ellen due to Allyson's pregnancy, over the objection of Walters who had spent a year-and-a-half nurturing her through her previous film, Summer Stock. Instead of listening to Walters' objection, Arthur Freed brought in Donen as director; Garland, who during rehearsal worked only half-days, started calling in sick as principal photography was to begin. Her behavior prompted Freed to replace her with Jane Powell and suspend Garland. According to Garland biographer, Gerold Frank, she was despondent about her career and personal life and she asked MGM to be released from her contract. MGM agreed and the contract that had begun in 1935 was abrogated on September 28, 1950.

Principal photography took place in 1950, from July 6 to August 24; retakes took place in mid-October.

The scene featuring the song "You're All the World to Me" was filmed by building a set inside a revolving barrel and mounting the camera and its operator to an ironing board which could be rotated along with the room. Astaire danced in the barrel set as if he really danced on the wall and ceiling. It inspired the Lionel Richie song "Dancing on the Ceiling" with the music video featuring Richie doing the same room dance as a tribute to Astaire.

Notable songs and dance routines

The songs in Royal Wedding were written by Burton Lane (music) and Alan Jay Lerner (lyrics).  The dances were choreographed by Nick Castle.

 "Ev'ry Night At Seven": The film's opening number has Astaire and Powell perform from the "play within a play" Broadway musical that their characters are taking to London.
 "Sunday Jumps": Astaire parodies himself by dancing with a hatrack. The fame of the dance rests on Astaire's ability to animate the inanimate. The solo takes place in a ship's gym, where Astaire is waiting to rehearse with his partner Powell, who doesn't turn up, echoing Adele Astaire's attitude toward her brother's obsessive rehearsal habits to which the lyrics (unused and unpublished) also made reference. In 1997, Astaire's widow Robyn authorized Dirt Devil to use a digitally altered version of the scene where Astaire dances with their product in a commercial; Astaire's daughter Ava objected publicly to the commercial, implying they had "tarnish[ed] his image" and saying it was "the antithesis of everything my lovely, gentle father represented"
 "Open Your Eyes": This waltz is sung by Powell at the beginning of a romantic routine danced by Powell and Astaire in front of an audience in the ballroom of a transatlantic liner. Soon, a storm rocks the ship and the duet is transformed into a comic routine with the dancers sliding about to the ship's motions. This number is based on a real-life incident which happened to Fred and Adele Astaire as they traveled by ship to London in 1923.
 "The Happiest Days of My Life": Powell's character sings this ballad to Lawford, with Astaire sitting at the piano.
 "How Could You Believe Me When I Said I Love You When You Know I've Been a Liar All My Life" has what is considered the longest title of any song in MGM musical history. For the first time in his career, Astaire casts aside all pretension to elegance and indulges in a comic song and dance vaudeville-style with Powell. The routine recalls the "A Couple Of Swells" number with Judy Garland in Easter Parade. Here, for the second time in the film, he seems to parody Gene Kelly by wearing the latter's trademark straw boater and employing the stomps and splayed strides that originated with George M. Cohan and were much favored in Kelly's choreography.
 "Too Late Now": Powell sings her third ballad, this time an open declaration of love, to Lawford.
 "You're All the World to Me": In one of his best-known solos, Astaire dances on the walls and ceilings of his room because he has fallen in love with a beautiful woman who also loves to dance. The idea occurred to Astaire back in the 1920s and was first mentioned by him in the MGM publicity publication Lion's Roar in 1945.
 "I Left My Hat in Haiti": This number, essentially the work of dance director Nick Castle, involves Powell, Astaire, and chorus in a song and dance routine with a Caribbean theme.

Reception
According to MGM's records, the film earned $2,548,000 in the US and Canada and $1,354,000 elsewhere, resulting in a profit to the studio of $584,000. The film was listed by Variety as one of the top box office hits of 1951.

Upon its release, Bosley Crowther in The New York Times wrote that the film had "a lively lot of dancing and some pleasantly handled songs"; according to Crowther, "Mr. Astaire has fared better in his lifetime - and he has also fared much worse."

On the review aggregator website Rotten Tomatoes, Royal Wedding had a 91% approval rating based on 23 reviews. The site's consensus reads: "Vintage MGM musical stuff, characterized by Stanley Donen's fleet direction and some amazing dance performances from star Fred Astaire."

Awards and honors
"Too Late Now" was nominated for an Academy Award for Best Original Song at the 24th Academy Awards, losing the award to "In the Cool, Cool, Cool of the Evening" by Hoagy Carmichael and Johnny Mercer, which featured in Here Comes the Groom.

The film is recognized by American Film Institute in these lists:
 2002: AFI's 100 Years...100 Passions – Nominated
 2006: AFI's Greatest Movie Musicals – Nominated

Home media
In 2007, Warner Home Video released Royal Wedding in a DVD set as part of its "Classic Musicals From The Dream Factory" series, along with "three fine-but-unexceptional films directed by Norman Taurog" and two other films: The Belle of New York and The Pirate.

The film was later featured in an episode of Cinema Insomnia. It is also distributed through Corinth Films.

The songs listed above were published by MGM on an early 10 inch long play record recorded at 33⅓ rpm (MGM E-543).

The song "Sunday Jumps" was referenced by Mel Gibson in What Women Want and by David Byrne in the Talking Heads concert film Stop Making Sense.  "Sunday Jumps" was also parodied by Kermit the Frog in The Great Muppet Caper.

References
Notes

Bibliography

External links

 
 
 
 
 
 

1951 films
1951 musical comedy films
1951 romantic comedy films
American musical comedy films
American romantic comedy films
American romantic musical films
1950s English-language films
Films directed by Stanley Donen
Films about weddings
Films produced by Arthur Freed
Films set in 1947
Films set in London
Films with screenplays by Alan Jay Lerner
Metro-Goldwyn-Mayer films
1950s American films